Beardshaw is an English surname. Notable people with this name include:

 Joe Beardshaw (born 1976), rugby union player
 Chris Beardshaw, British garden designer, plantsman, author, speaker and broadcaster
 Ernest Beardshaw (1912–1977), football defender
 Virginia Beardshaw, chair of the Annual Fund at the London School of Economics and Political Science

English-language surnames